Te-mari'i-a-Teurura'i Ma'i-hara Te-uhe (1840 – 21 August 1891) was a Polynesian queen who reigned the kingdom of Huahine in 18 March 1888 – 22 July 1890 under the reign name Teuhe; her name had also been given as Teuhe II. She belongs to the Teururai family of Huahine.

Family
She was born at Huahine, ca. 1840. She was the eldest daughter of Queen Tehaapapa II and King Arii-mate of Huahine.

She was proclaimed as Queen Teuhe during an insurrection against France on February 22, 1888 and fled to Tahiti to seek protection under her former husband, Pomare V, 22 July 1890.

Marriage

She married as his first wife, at Huahine, on 11 November 1857 (div. 5 August 1861), Pōmare V, King of Tahiti, eldest surviving son of Pōmare IV, Queen of Tahiti, by her second husband. They divorced on 5 August 1861.

She died without issue at Papeete, 21 August 1891.

Ancestry

See also
French Polynesia
Annexation of the Leeward Islands
List of monarchs who lost their thrones in the 19th century

References

 Tahiti, les temps et les pouvoirs. Pour une anthropologie historique du Tahiti post-européen, Paris, ORSTOM, 543 p., Jean-François BARE.
 Trois ans chez les Canaques. Odyssée d'un Neuchâtelois autour du monde. Lausanne, Payot & C° Editeurs, 342p., Eugène HANNI.
 Huahine aux temps anciens, Cahiers du Patrimoine [Savoirs et traditions] et Tradition orale, B.SAURA, édition 2006.
 Chefs et notables au temps du protectorat: 1842 - 1880, Société des Etudes Océaniennes, Raoul TEISSIER, réédition de 1996.

1840 births
1891 deaths
Huahine royalty

Queens regnant in Oceania
19th-century monarchs in Oceania
19th-century women rulers